is a city located in Miyagi Prefecture, Japan. , the city had an estimated population of 128,763 in 51,567 households, and a population density of 160 persons per km².

Geography
Ōsaki is in north-central Miyagi Prefecture in the northern Sendai Plain. The Furukawa area in the center of the city is a base for commercial and service industries in the northern portion of Miyagi Prefecture, and the Naruko area in the northwestern of the city is noted for hot spring tourism . The Kashimadai and Matsuyama districts in the southeastern part of the city are within the commuting zone of Sendai.

Climate
Ōsaki has a humid subtropical climate (Köppen climate classification Cfa) characterized by hot summers and mild winters. The average annual temperature in Ōsaki is 11.5 °C. The average annual rainfall is 1249 mm with September as the wettest month. The temperatures are highest on average in August, at around 24.4 °C, and lowest in January, at around -0.6 °C.

Neighboring municipalities
Miyagi Prefecture
Tome
Kurihara
Misato
Wakuya
Ōsato
Ōhira
Shikama
Kami
Matsushima
Yamagata Prefecture
Mogami
Akita Prefecture
Yuzawa

Demographics
Per Japanese census data, the population of Ōsaki has remained relatively steady over the past 60 years.

History
The area of present-day Ōsaki was part of ancient Mutsu Province, and has been settled since at least the Jōmon period by the Emishi people. During the Nara period, gold was discovered in the area. During later portion of the Heian period, the area was ruled by the Northern Fujiwara. During the Sengoku period, the area was contested by various samurai clans before the area came under the control of the Date clan of Sendai Domain during the Edo period, under the Tokugawa shogunate.

The town of Furukawa was established with the creation of the modern municipalities system on April 1, 1889. It was raised to city status on December 15, 1950.

The city of Ōsaki was established on March 31, 2006, from the merger of the city of Furukawa absorbed the towns of Iwadeyama and Naruko (both from Tamatsukuri District), the towns of Kashimadai, Matsuyama and Sanbongi (all from Shida District), and the town of Tajiri (from Tōda District).

Government
Ōsaki has a mayor-council form of government with a directly elected mayor and a unicameral city legislature of 30 members. Ōsaki  contributes four seats to the Miyagi Prefectural legislature. In terms of national politics, the city is part of Miyagi 6th district of the lower house of the Diet of Japan.

Economy
The economy of Ōsaki is largely based on agriculture, primarily the cultivation of rice and soybeans. Industry includes electronics, precision machining and construction materials.

Education
Miyagi Seishin Junior College
 Ōsaki has 25 elementary public schools and 10 public junior high schools operated by the city government. There are five public high schools, and two combined public middle/high schools operated by the Miyagi Prefectural Board of Education and two private high schools and one combined private middle/high school. The prefecture also operates one special education school for the handicapped.

Transportation

Railway
 East Japan Railway Company (JR East) - Tōhoku Shinkansen 
 
 East Japan Railway Company (JR East) - Tōhoku Main Line 
  -  - 
 East Japan Railway Company (JR East) - Rikuu East Line 
  -  -  -  -  -  -  -  -  -  -  -  -

Highway
 - Furukawa IC; Chōjahara PA

Local attractions
Yūbikan, former Date clan school and gardens; registered National Historic Site and Place of Scenic Beauty 
Miyazawa Site, ruins of early Heian-period fort; National Historic Site
Yamahata Cave Tomb Cluster, National Historic Site
Daikichiyama Tile Kiln Site, National Historic Site
Nakazawame Shell Mound, National Historic Site
Kido Tile Kiln Site, National Historic Site
Myōdate Kanga ruins, National Historic Site
Dewa Sendai Kaidō Nakayamagoe Pass, National Historic Site
Nippon Kokeshi Museum. as known well for museum at Miyagi Prefecture

Sister city relations
 - Middletown, Ohio, USA, since October 18, 1990
 - Jinshui District, Zhengzhou, Henan Province, China, since July 19, 1994
 - Dublin, Georgia, USA, since May 29, 1998

Noted people from Ōsaki 
Sakuzō Yoshino, author
Shinji Yoshino, politician, cabinet minister
Frank Nagai, singer
Ryōji Chūbachi, businessman
Naoko Fujioka, female professional boxer
Mao Inoue, professional wrestler

References

External links

Official Website 

 
Cities in Miyagi Prefecture